Not invented here (NIH) is the tendency to avoid using or buying products, research, standards, or knowledge from external origins. It is usually adopted by social, corporate, or institutional cultures. Research illustrates a strong bias against ideas from the outside.

The reasons for not wanting to use the work of others are varied, but can include a desire to support a local economy instead of paying royalties to a foreign license-holder, fear of patent infringement, lack of understanding of the foreign work, an unwillingness to acknowledge or value the work of others, jealousy, belief perseverance, or forming part of a wider turf war. As a social phenomenon, this tendency can manifest itself as an unwillingness to adopt an idea or product because it originates from another culture, a form of tribalism and/or an inadequate effort in choosing the right approach for the business.

The term is typically used in a pejorative sense. The opposite predisposition is sometimes called "proudly found elsewhere" (PFE) or "invented elsewhere".

In computing  
In computer programming, "NIH syndrome" refers to the belief that in-house developments are inherently better suited, more secure, more controlled, quicker to develop, and incur lower overall cost (including maintenance cost) than using existing implementations.

In some cases, software with the same functionality as an existing one is re-implemented just to allow the use of a different software license. One approach to doing so is clean room design.

See also

References 

Appeals to emotion
Economics of intellectual property
Cognitive biases